F.C. Afon Novy Afon is a football club in the city of Novy Afon, in the state of Abkhazia that competes in the Abkhazian Premier League.

History
Founded on 2005 in the city of Novy Afon in the state of Abkhazia, the club is affiliated with the Football Federation of Abkhazia.

Titles
  Abkhazian Premier League (3)  
 Abkhazia Super Cup (3)

References 

Association football clubs established in 2005